Jade City is a 2017 fantasy novel by Fonda Lee. It won the World Fantasy Award in 2018 and is the first in the Green Bone Saga. It was followed by Jade War in 2019 and Jade Legacy in 2021.

The titular Jade City is a nickname for Janloon, the capital of the island of Kekon in the novel's secondary world setting. One reviewer described Kekon as "an analog of mid-20th-century Hong Kong" although Lee has alluded to the setting being inspired by Asia more generally, stating that Kekon is not "Hong Kong or Taiwan or Japan or China or any of those places." She has stated that one of her goals for the novel was to "write an epic fantasy that was not set in medieval Europe," featuring "the scheming and politics and clash of noble houses elements" in a "different cultural setting but also different time period."

Clans 

The events of Jade City take place a generation after the end of the Many Nations War, a conflict roughly analogous to World War II, during which the One Mountain Society, a national liberation movement, successfully fought to end foreign occupation of Kekon. After the war, a dispute over opening Kekon to international trade led to the One Mountain Society disintegrating into a number of rival clans, with the most powerful being the isolationist Mountain clan led by the Ayt family and the internationalist No Peak clan led by the Kaul family.

The organization of the clans is similar to the crime families in The Godfather, in which the Corleone family has a don, underboss and consigliere; the clans each have a Pillar, Horn and Weather Man. The Pillar is the head of the clan, the Horn leads its street fighters and the Weather Man is responsible for business activities.

The Horn oversees the clan's Fists, who each command a number of Fingers, similar to caporegimes and soldiers in the American Mafia. Unlike in the Mafia, the Weather Man manages an office in the business district, staffed by clan members known as Luckbringers.

Outside of the family but still part of the clan are the Lantern Men, business owners who were civilian accomplices in the liberation movement. After the war they began to pay financial tribute to the clans in return for protection from criminal gangs of untrained jade users.

Clan members who wear jade are known as Green Bones. They are governed by the aisho honor code, which prevents them from killing unjaded family members of their enemies except in very specific circumstances (clan informants who wear no jade are known as White Rats, and can be killed without violating aisho).

Jade 

Kekon contains the world's only supply of jade, a mineral that endows its wearer with enhanced abilities. Safe use of jade requires a combination of genetic predisposition and intense training in the six disciplines of Strength, Steel, Perception, Lightness, Deflection and Channelling.

Before writing Jade City, Lee received an MBA from Stanford, worked as a business strategist and wrote science fiction novels. She has stated that she "[treats] the magic almost in a science fictional way" and as "a way to have the international trade and politics play out in the storyline." Jade is the only magical element in the novel, and while the Kekonese regard it as having mystical properties, the Westerners refer to it as "bioenergetic jade," something explicable by science.

An individual's response to jade is determined by their genetic makeup. The aboriginal population of Kekon, the Abukei, are completely immune to its effects, while individuals from outside Kekon are too sensitive to it. Only the Kekonese, with mixed aboriginal and settler ancestry, have the necessary combination of resistance and sensitivity to be able to use it long-term, although there are wide variations in jade ability among the population, for reasons not well understood. In addition, some Kekonese are born with a recessive genetic trait that makes them immune to jade. These individuals are known as "stone-eyes", and are considered unlucky by other Kekonese. Lee has commented that she tied jade ability to a combination of genetics and luck as "a way to subvert that trope of the blood talent... the chosen ones."

Kekonese jade users have to spend years in training at the clan academies to use it safely. Overexposure to jade leads to The Itches, a condition causing madness and eventual death. Jade tolerance can also be increased through injections of a drug called SN1 or "shine." Shine is used as a medicine to treat Green Bones, and in addition is traded on the black market and used illicitly by Kekonese who want to wear jade but who do not have academy training. It is also used outside Kekon to facilitate military use of jade by non-Kekonese troops.

Use and production of jade on Kekon is governed by various traditions and institutions. Green Bones are entitled to claim the jade from enemies they kill in combat. Jade use is supposed to be kept out of government, so members of the Royal Council of Kekon, a representative assembly with lawmaking powers, are banned from wearing it. Jade mining is overseen by the Kekon Jade Alliance (KJA), a private business consortium whose shares are split between the clans. The KJA makes allocations of jade to various organizations including the temples of Deitism, Kekon's main religion, where it is used in rituals.

Characters

No Peak clan
 Lan (Kaul Lanshinwan): The recently-anointed Pillar, inheriting the role from his grandfather Kaul Sen. Lan's wife recently left him for another man, causing him to lose face in Kekon and affecting his confidence in his abilities. Despite this, he strives to be a strong leader for the clan.
 Hilo (Kaul Hiloshudon): Horn and brother of the Pillar, a big-hearted, hot-headed street fighter who commands absolute loyalty from his subordinates.
 Shae (Kaul Shaelinsan): The third Kaul sibling, Shae holds no position in the clan and wears no jade by choice, despite having completed her training at the Academy. After the breakup of her relationship with a non-Kekonese soldier, Shae returns to Kekon looking for a job outside the clan where she can put her foreign education to use.
 Kaul Sen (Kaul Seningtun): Original clan Pillar, known as the Torch of Kekon for his actions during the battle for independence. Now retired and slipping into dementia, he is a shadow of the man he once was.
 Kaul Wan Ria (Kaul Wan Riamasan) Daughter-in-law of Kaul Sen and mother of the Kaul siblings. Her husband died in the war and she takes no part in clan affairs.
 Doru (Yun Dorupon): The aged, calculating Weather Man of No Peak, increasingly at odds with the younger generation now in charge of the clan.
 Anden (Emery Anden): Adopted grandson of Kaul Sen, he is in his final year as a student at the Academy.
 Wen (Maik Wenruxian): Sister of two prominent Fists of the No Peak clan, she is in a relationship with Hilo. She is a stone-eye.

Mountain clan
 Ayt Mada (Ayt Madashi): Ruthless Pillar who inherited the role by murdering the other contenders when her adoptive father Ayt Yugontin, the Spear of Kekon, died.
 Gont Asch (Gont Aschentu): Fearsome, brutish Horn whose physical prowess masks hidden cunning.
 Ree Tura (Ree Turahuo): Weather Man. Nearing retirement, he is not well-regarded by the Pillar or Horn.

Unaffiliated
 Bero: A minor street thief. Despite being untrained, he has ambitions to wear jade and doesn't mind how he gets it.
 Mudt (Mudt Jindonon): A smuggler and informant who sells Bero's stolen merchandise through his discount goods store.

Plot
Bero, a minor thief, attempts to steal jade from a No Peak Fist while he is dining in a clan-affiliated restaurant, but Bero and his Abukei accomplice Sampa are quickly caught and brought to Hilo for punishment. After they are beaten, a remark by Sampa about a recent murder in clan territory leads Hilo to take the two boys to be questioned in the presence of his brother Lan, the clan Pillar.

Hilo attempts to convince Lan that the Mountain clan is squeezing No Peak territory, but he is opposed by Doru the Weather Man, who suggests it is a misunderstanding and counsels a peaceful solution. Feeling frustrated and unsupported by Doru, Lan asks his grandfather for permission to replace him as Weather Man, but Kaul Sen refuses to allow it. A short time after this, Shae returns to Kekon, looking for a job that will not require her to wear jade.

The Mountain comes close to violating aisho by kidnapping Anden, who is still in his final year at the Academy. Ayt Mada offers Anden a position in her clan, signalling that she wishes to unite the Mountain and No Peak. Her purpose is partially to send a message that she considers Hilo an unsuitable Horn.

Once Anden has been returned safely, Lan begins to move against the Mountain. He proposes a new law preventing any one clan from gaining control of the Kekon Jade Alliance, and he sends Shae to audit the KJA's accounts, looking for irregularities.

Their message to Anden having been disregarded, the Mountain makes an attempt on Hilo's life. In retaliation, No Peak threatens to storm their training complex. To prevent this, the Mountain apologizes, gives up the would-be assassins and makes a territorial concession. The more senior of the assassins offers Lan a clean blade, demanding to be killed in combat. Believing that he needs to prove himself to the clan in order to remain Pillar, Lan accepts and wins the duel, but only barely.

In the aftermath, Hilo asks his brother for permission to marry his girlfriend Wen, and Lan, despite misgivings about his brother marrying a stone-eye from a disreputable family, gives his permission.

Lan has been injured in the duel and his jade tolerance has been affected, but he cannot be seen to show weakness by failing to wear the additional jade he has won. He arranges for Anden to bring him packages of shine. When Anden realizes what he is delivering he pleads with Lan to stop using the drug, but Lan swears him to secrecy. When Shae comes to see Anden he tries to tell her about the shine, but misses his opportunity.

Shae reports to Lan that someone in the KJA is skimming jade, and that either Doru doesn't know about it and is incompetent, or he is allowing it to happen. Lan sends Doru overseas to get him out of the way and tells his allies on the Royal Council that he is going to suspend jade production. Lan receives a letter from his estranged wife, but can't bring himself to open it.

Meanwhile Bero has been stealing shipments from the Docks. Through his fence he meets a mysterious Mountain Green Bone, who gives Bero a submachine gun and tells him to use it to shoot up the gentleman's club Lan frequents. Lan accidentally takes an overdose of shine while visiting the club, and when Bero attacks him he falls into the sea and drowns.

When Shae hears about his death she immediately goes to the bank where her jade is kept and puts it all back on. Hilo is now Pillar and she persuades him to strike back by reclaiming some disputed territory rather than launching an all-out attack on the Mountain. She takes part in the battle, fighting several Mountain Green Bones and killing two. Afterward, Hilo asks her to become his Weather Man and she agrees. She cements her position by gaining the support of her main rivals for the role, and she spares Doru's life on condition that he gives up his jade, renounces clan business and spends his remaining days as a companion for her grandfather.

The clans are now in a state of open war. Shae and Hilo attend negotiations with Ayt Mada and her Weather Man until Hilo accuses the Mountain of skimming jade from the KJA and supplying it to non-Green Bones, then storms out. Ayt arranges to meet Shae on safe ground and tries to talk her into betraying No Peak, but Shae refuses, knowing that she is putting her life in serious jeopardy by doing so. She tells Hilo that No Peak can only hold out for another six months.

Wen asks Shae to make her a spy for the clan, without Hilo's knowledge. Shae sends her to a foreign military base with a shipment of jade worth millions, re-establishing the supply that has been disrupted by the KJA's suspension of jade production.

Kaul Sen gives his jade to Doru, and Doru uses it to attack his guards and escape, defecting to the Mountain with all his knowledge of No Peak's business dealings. The Mountain continues to use its superior position to maim and kill No Peak Green Bones. On New Year's Day, Hilo marries Wen, then has Anden drive him into Mountain territory to be killed in combat, in return for clemency for the remaining No Peak clan members. Hilo kills several Green Bones but is overwhelmed. When Gont Asch steps in to finish him, Hilo and Anden together kill the Horn of the Mountain.

The fight leaves Anden in a coma. When he regains consciousness, he learns that the loss of its Horn has dealt the Mountain a serious blow and given No Peak a temporary advantage in the war. Anden returns to the Academy for his graduation ceremony, but when he is presented with his jade he declares he does not want to be a Green Bone. He tells Hilo he does not want a life of violence, and when the Pillar rebukes him Anden runs from the Academy to Lan's grave.

Later, under cover of darkness, Bero also visits the grave. He is still looking for jade, and in the former Pillar's coffin there is a generous supply.

Reception
Publishers Weekly called the novel "an engaging blend of crime drama and Asian martial arts film tropes" and it received a starred review from Library Journal.

Jade City won the 2018 World Fantasy Award (tied with Victor LaValle's The Changeling) and the Aurora Award, and was a finalist for the Nebula, Locus, Ignyte and Dragon Awards.

In August 2020, it was reported that Peacock is developing a television series adaptation of the novel. The series will be produced by Universal Television with Dave Kalstein as writer and executive producer, Breck Eisner as director and executive producer and Dean Georgaris as executive producer. In June 2022, Lee announced that the series was not moving forward at the service and would be shopped again.

References

External links

2017 American novels
2017 fantasy novels
World Fantasy Award for Best Novel-winning works
Wuxia novels
American novels adapted into television shows
Orbit Books books